Hakan Akman (born 9 October 1989) is a Turkish professional footballer who plays as a forward for Kahta 02 Spor. Akman was also a youth international.

References

External links

1989 births
Living people
People from Merzifon
Turkish footballers
Turkey under-21 international footballers
Samsunspor footballers
Şanlıurfaspor footballers
Turkey youth international footballers
Association football forwards